Stockade is a 1971 Australian musical film directed by Hans Pomeranz and Ross McGregor and starring Rod Mullinar. It is about the Eureka Stockade.

Cast
Michelle Fawdon as Elizabeth Green
Rod Mullinar as Peter Lalor
GrahamCorry as George Black
Sue Hollywood as Ma Bentley
Charles Thorne as Captain Thomas
Norman Willison as Johnny
Max Cullen as Raffaello Carboni
Michael Rolfe as Captain Wise

Production
The film was based on a musical play by Kenneth Cook which had been commissioned by the New South Wales Drama foundation and first performed in March 1971 at the Independent Theatre in Sydney. Most of the original cast returned and the play's director Ross McGregor was director of acting.

Shooting took place in May 1971 immediately after the end of the play's Sydney season. The shoot only took two weeks in at the Australiana Pioneer Village, Wilberforce, near Sydney. $15,000 of the budget came from the Australian Council for the Arts and $16,000 from the Australian Film Development Corporation.

Release
In December 1971 the MP for Ballarat, Dudley Erwin, criticised the use of government money to make Stockadeas it contained brothel scenes, and asked for it to be withdrawn from circulation.

The movie struggled to get distribution. Hans Pomeranz and Kenneth Cook complained that the NSW government refused to enforce the Film Quota Act but at the same time prevented public screenings in unlicensed halls, stopping Australian producers from finding alternatives to screen their films. Hans Pomeranz issued a formal demand to Eric Willis, chief secretary of the NSW government for an inquiry into the New South Wales industry. He was ultimately unsuccessful.

Pomeranz and Cook eventually distributed the film themselves. Commercial reception was poor but the film was widely screened in schools and on television.

References

External links

Stockade at Oz Movies

1971 films
1970s Western (genre) musical films
British Empire war films
Films about rebellions
Australian films based on actual events
Films set in Victoria (Australia)
Films based on works by Australian writers
Films set in colonial Australia
Australian Western (genre) musical films
Films set in 1854
Films about mining
1970s English-language films